Colombia competed at the 2016 Summer Olympics in Rio de Janeiro, Brazil, from 5 to 21 August 2016. This was the nation's nineteenth appearance at the Summer Olympics. The Colombian Olympic Committee sent the nation's largest ever delegation to the Games, with 147 athletes, 74 men and 73 women, competing across 23 sports.

Colombia returned home from Rio de Janeiro with a total of eight medals (three gold, two silver, and three bronze), marking the nation's most successful outcome in Summer Olympic history based on the gold medal count. Moreover, it matched the overall medal tally from the 2012 Summer Olympics in London. Two of these medals were awarded to the Colombian team in BMX cycling, boxing, and weightlifting, and one each in athletics and judo.

The nation's most significant highlight of the Games came from BMX rider Mariana Pajón, who successfully defended her title in the women's race and set a record as the first Colombian to receive two Olympic gold medals. Apart from Pajón, triple jumper Caterine Ibargüen, and weightlifting veteran Óscar Figueroa also helped the Colombians bring home more golds from Rio de Janeiro than ever before, with Figueroa becoming the first male from his country to top the podium at his fourth and final Olympics.

Boxers Yuberjen Martínez (men's light flyweight) and Ingrit Valencia (women's flyweight) brought home medals in their signature sport, last achieved at the 1988. Judoka and triple world titlist Yuri Alvear joined Pajon and freestyle wrestler Jackeline Rentería as the only Colombian women to win two Olympic medals, with a silver medal in the women's 70 kg division. The remaining medals went to BMX rider Carlos Ramirez in the men's race, and weightlifter Luis Javier Mosquera, who received the bronze in the men's 69 kg, following the disqualification of Kyrgyzstan's Izzat Artykov over a doping offense.

Medalists

| width=78% align=left valign=top |

| width="22%" align="left" valign="top" |

Competitors
The Colombian Olympic Committee confirmed a team of 147 athletes, 74 men and 73 women, to compete across 23 sports at the Games. It was the nation's largest ever delegation sent to the Olympics, breaking its previous record of 104 athletes set in London four years earlier.

Football (for both men and women) and women's rugby sevens were the only team-based sports in which Colombia qualified for the Games, with the men's football squad returning to the Olympic tournament for the first time in 24 years. For individual-based sports, Colombia marked its Olympic debut in golf (new to the 2016 Games) and synchronized swimming.

Track and field accounted for the largest number of athletes on the Colombian team by an individual sport, with 34 entries. There was a single competitor each in golf, sailing, shooting, and table tennis.

Eight of the nation's Olympic medalists from London 2012 returned, including defending champion Mariana Pajón in the women's BMX race, triple jumper Caterine Ibargüen, weightlifter and four-time Olympian Óscar Figueroa (men's 69 kg), judoka and triple world titleist Yuri Alvear (women's 70 kg), BMX rider Carlos Oquendo, professional road cyclist Rigoberto Urán, taekwondo fighter Óscar Muñoz (men's 58 kg), and freestyle wrestler Jackeline Rentería, who became the first Colombian woman in history to earn two Olympic medals. 50-year-old trap shooter Danilo Caro headlined the full roster of Colombian athletes by competing at his record fifth Olympics. Along with Figueroa, three Colombian athletes also vied for their fourth consecutive appearance, including race walker Luis Fernando López, backstroke swimmer Omar Pinzón, and weightlifter Ubaldina Valoyes (women's 75 kg).

18-year-old relay track sprinter Anthony Zambrano was Colombia's youngest competitor, with show jumper René Lopez rounding out the field as the oldest competitor (aged 52). Artistic gymnast Jossimar Calvo was initially selected through a nationwide online text-message voting to carry the Colombian flag, but forced to decline the honor due to his competition schedule on the first day of the Games. Instead, Alvear, who entered the Games with a bronze medal from London 2012 and three world titles, took over Calvo's spot at the last minute to lead the Colombian team at the opening ceremony.

| width=78% align=left valign=top |
The following is the list of number of competitors participating in the Games. Note that reserves in fencing and football are not counted as athletes:

Archery

Three Colombian archers qualified for the women's events after having secured a top eight finish in the team recurve at the 2015 World Archery Championships in Copenhagen, Denmark. Another Colombian archer also qualified for the men's individual recurve by obtaining one of the eight Olympic places available from the same tournament.

Athletics (track and field)

Colombian athletes have so far achieved qualifying standards in the following athletics events (up to a maximum of 3 athletes in each event):

Track & road events
Men

Women

Field events

Combined events – Women's heptathlon

Boxing

Colombia has entered five boxers to compete in each of the following weight classes into the Olympic boxing tournament. Yuberjen Martinez, Jorge Vivas, and Ingrit Valencia had claimed their Olympic spots at the 2016 American Qualification Tournament in Buenos Aires, Argentina. Juan Carlos Carrillo and Ceiber Ávila rounded out the Colombian roster at the 2016 APB and WSB Olympic Qualifier in Vargas, Venezuela.

Cycling

Road
Colombian riders qualified for a maximum of five quota places in the men's Olympic road race by virtue of their top 5 final national ranking in the 2015 UCI World Tour. One additional spot was awarded to the Colombian cyclist in the women's road race by virtue of her top 100 individual placement in the 2016 UCI World Rankings. The men's road cycling team, headlined by world no. 5 rider Nairo Quintana and London 2012 silver medalist Rigoberto Urán, were named to the Olympic roster on 17 April 2016. However, Quintana stepped back, admitting that he decided to focus on the upcoming Vuelta a España instead.

Track
Following the completion of the 2016 UCI Track Cycling World Championships, Colombian riders have accumulated five spots in both the men's and women's sprint, men's and women's keirin, and men's omnium, by virtue of their final individual Olympic rankings in those events. The full track cycling team was named to the Colombian roster for the Games on 6 July 2016.

Sprint

Keirin

Omnium

Mountain biking
Colombia has qualified one mountain biker for the men's Olympic cross-country race, by virtue of a top two national finish, not yet qualified, at the Pan American Championships.

BMX
Colombian riders qualified for two men's and one women's quota place in BMX at the Olympics, as a result of the nation's seventh-place finish for men and fourth for women in the UCI Olympic Ranking List of 31 May 2016. Reigning Olympic champion Mariana Pajón, London 2012 bronze medalist Carlos Oquendo, and rookie Carlos Ramirez were named to the Colombian team at the conclusion of the World Championships on 29 May 2016.

Diving 

Colombian divers qualified for three individual spots at the Olympics by virtue of a top 18 finish respectively at the 2016 FINA World Cup series.

Equestrian

Colombia has entered two riders into the Olympic equestrian competition by virtue of a top six individual finish at the 2015 Pan American Games.

Jumping

Fencing

Colombia has entered two fencers into the Olympic competition. London 2012 Olympian Saskia García had claimed an Olympic spot in the women's foil as the highest-ranked fencer from America outside the world's top 14 in the FIE Adjusted Official Rankings. Meanwhile, Jhon Edison Rodríguez rounded out the Colombian roster as the sole winner of the men's épée at the Pan American Zonal Qualifier in San José, Costa Rica.

Football

Men's tournament

Colombia men's football team qualified for the Olympics with a 2–1 victory over the United States at the second leg of the CONCACAF-CONMEBOL play-off, signifying the nation's Olympic comeback for the first time after 24 years.

Team roster

Group play

Quarterfinal

Women's tournament

Colombia women's football team qualified for the Olympics by finishing second behind Brazil at the 2014 Copa América Femenina in Ecuador.

Team roster

Group play

Golf

Colombia has entered one golfer into the Olympic tournament. Mariajo Uribe (world no. 103) qualified directly among the top 60 eligible players for the women's event based on the IGF World Rankings as of 11 July 2016.

Gymnastics

Artistic
Colombia has entered two artistic gymnasts into the Olympic competition. A Colombian male gymnast, whose name had yet to be determined, and Catalina Escobar had claimed their Olympic spots each in the men's and women's apparatus and all-around events, respectively, at the Olympic Test Event in Rio de Janeiro.

Men

Women

Judo

Colombia had qualified two judokas for each of the following weight classes at the 2016 Summer Olympics. Yuri Alvear, a three time Olympian by the 2012 London Summer Olympics earning a bronze medal, was ranked among the top 14 eligible judokas for women in the IJF World Ranking List of 30 May 2016. Olympian Yadinis Amaris in the women's lightweight (57 kg) earned a continental quota spot from the Pan American region, as the highest-ranked Colombian judoka outside of direct qualifying position.

Rugby sevens

Women's tournament

The Colombia women's team qualified automatically based on their top finish at the 2015 CONSUR Women's Sevens.

Team roster
 

Group play

Classification semifinal (9–12)

Eleventh place game

Sailing

Colombia has qualified a boat in the men's RS:X class by virtue of a top finish for Central & South America at the 2016 ISAF World Cup regatta in Miami, Florida, United States.

M = Medal race; EL = Eliminated – did not advance into the medal race

Shooting

Colombia has received a wildcard invitation from ISSF to send Danilo Caro, who will be going to his sixth Olympics, in the men's trap, as long as the minimum qualifying score (MQS) was fulfilled by 31 March 2016.

Qualification Legend: Q = Qualify for the next round; q = Qualify for the bronze medal (shotgun)

Swimming

Colombian swimmers have so far achieved qualifying standards in the following events (up to a maximum of 2 swimmers in each event at the Olympic Qualifying Time (OQT), and potentially 1 at the Olympic Selection Time (OST)):

Synchronized swimming

Colombia has fielded a squad of two synchronized swimmers to compete only in the women's duet by virtue of their eleventh-place finish at the FINA Olympic test event in Rio de Janeiro.

Table tennis

Colombia has entered one athlete into the table tennis competition at the Games. Lady Ruano secured the Olympic spot in the women's singles by virtue of her top six finish at the 2016 Latin American Qualification Tournament in Santiago, Chile.

Taekwondo

Colombia entered two athletes into the taekwondo competition at the Olympics. 2012 Olympic bronze medalist Óscar Muñoz, and 2008 Olympian Doris Patiño secured the spots in the men's flyweight (58 kg) and women's lightweight category (57 kg) respectively by virtue of their top two finish at the 2016 Pan American Qualification Tournament in Aguascalientes, Mexico.

Tennis

Colombia has entered three tennis players into the Olympic tournament. Juan Sebastián Cabal and Robert Farah qualified directly for the men's doubles by virtue of their combined top 30 placement in the ATP World Rankings as of 6 June 2016. Meanwhile, Mariana Duque received a spare ITF Olympic place to compete in the women's singles, as the next highest-ranked eligible player, not yet qualified, in the WTA World Rankings, as a result of three players' withdrawal from the Games due to concerns on Zika virus.

Weightlifting

Colombian weightlifters have qualified five men's and four women's quota places for the Rio Olympics based on their combined team standing by points at the 2014 and 2015 IWF World Championships. The team must allocate these places to individual athletes by 20 June 2016.

Men

* Mosquera originally placed fourth behind initial bronze medalist Izzat Artykov of Kyrgyzstan. Artykov was later disqualified after testing positive for a banned substance called strychnine. The bronze medal stripped from Artykov is reallocated to Mosquera.

Women

Wrestling

Colombia has qualified a total of five wrestlers for each of the following weight classes into the Olympic competition. Two of them had booked Olympic spots each in the women's freestyle (58 & 75 kg) at the 2015 World Championships, while the majority of Olympic berths were awarded to Colombian wrestlers, who progressed to the top two finals at the 2016 Pan American Qualification Tournament.

Men's freestyle

Men's Greco-Roman

Women's freestyle

See also
Colombia at the 2015 Pan American Games
Colombia at the 2016 Winter Youth Olympics
Colombia at the 2016 Summer Paralympics

References

External links 

 

Nations at the 2016 Summer Olympics
2016
2016 in Colombian sport